The Vanishing Dagger is a 1920 American adventure film serial directed by Edward A. Kull, J. P. McGowan, and Eddie Polo. It is presumed to be a lost film. Portions of this serial were filmed in England. The film had the working title The Thirteenth Hour.

Cast
 Eddie Polo as John Edward Grant
 Thelma Percy as Elizabeth Latimer
 C. Norman Hammond as Sir George Latimer
 Laura Oakley as Lady Mary Latimer
 Ray Ripley as Prince Narr
 Karl Silvera as Prince Zan
 Ruth Royce as Sonia, Narr's Favorite
 Thomas G. Lingham as King Claypool
 Peggy O'Day as Nell (credited as Peggy O'Dare)
 Texas Watts as Len, Grant's Man
 Arthur Jarvis as Sir Richard Upton
 Leach Cross
 Leslie T. Peacocke
 J. P. McGowan

Chapter titles
 The Scarlet Confession
 The Night of Terror
 In Death's Clutches
 On the Trail of the Dagger
 The End of the Rustlers
 A Terrible Calamity
 Plunged to His Doom
 In Unmerciful Hands
 The Lights of Liverpool (a.k.a. Ferocious Foes)
 When London Sleeps
 A Race to Scotland
 An Evil Plot
 Spears of Death
 Walls of Doom
 The Great Pendulum
 Beneath the Sea
 Beasts of the Jungle
 The Vanishing Dagger (a.k.a. Silver Linings)

See also
 List of film serials
 List of film serials by studio
 List of lost films

References

External links

1920 films
1920 adventure films
1920 lost films
American silent serial films
American black-and-white films
American adventure films
Films directed by Edward A. Kull
Lost American films
Universal Pictures film serials
1920s American films
Silent adventure films
1920s English-language films